Günter Malcher (born 16 March 1934) is a German athlete. He competed in the men's pole vault at the 1960 Summer Olympics.

References

1934 births
Living people
Athletes (track and field) at the 1960 Summer Olympics
German male pole vaulters
Olympic athletes of the United Team of Germany
Place of birth missing (living people)